Kadyrelite is a mineral with the chemical formula  discovered in 1987.

External links 
Webmineral.com - Kadyrelite
Mindat.org - Kadyrelite
Handbook of Mineralogy - Kadyrelite

Mercury(I) minerals
Halide minerals
Oxide minerals
Cubic minerals
Minerals in space group 230